Priyo.com, often referred to simply as Priyo, meaning "Dear" in English, is a Bengali internet portal and news media company that was founded by Zakaria Swapan in 2011. Based in Bangladesh and intended primarily for local readers, it features pop cultural news, local interest stories and political and cultural commentary in Bengali.

History
In 2011, Priyo was founded in Dhaka, Bangladesh by Zakaria Swapan. It is one of the enlisted companies of the Bangladesh Association of Software and Services (BASIS), listed as Priyo Ltd. It is financed primarily by FENOX Venture Capital.

References

External links
 Official website

Newspapers published in Dhaka
Bangladeshi news websites